Suliman "Suli" McCullough (born January 12, 1968) is an American actor, comedian, and writer. He is best known for his recurring role as Dwayne "Mouse" Abercromie on The WB sitcom The Jamie Foxx Show, and his portrayal of "Crazy Legs" in the 1996 spoof comedy film Don't Be a Menace to South Central While Drinking Your Juice in the Hood. McCullough also portrayed the voice of a clown doll in another parody film, Scary Movie 2.

Early life 
Suli was born in Cupertino, California, and graduated from Cupertino High School in 1985. He attended the University of California, Los Angeles.

Career 
McCullough has also had several dramatic roles depicting real-life individuals. He portrayed Tina Turner's oldest biological son Craig Turner in the 1993 biopic What's Love Got to Do with It, as well as civil rights icon Terrence Roberts in the 1993 Disney Channel movie The Ernest Green Story. Additionally, he was a writer on The Tonight Show with Jay Leno and has been the head writer for ESPN's ESPY Awards. McCullough was credited as a writer for the 73rd Primetime Emmy Awards, American Music Awards of 2021, and 94th Academy Awards.

Personal life 
Suli has two children with former wife Donyell McCullough. His oldest daughter, Kennedy, is an actress. His son, Nahzi, is a model.

Filmography

Film

Television

References

External links

Date of birth unknown
American male screenwriters
Writers from Los Angeles
Living people
African-American male actors
American male film actors
1968 births
Screenwriters from California
21st-century African-American people
20th-century African-American people